Born Suspect is the first comedy album by Chris Rock, recorded in 1991 in Atlanta, Georgia.

Tracks
All tracks by Chris Rock, except where noted.

 "Intro" – 0:28
 "The South" – 0:46
 "Weaves/Color Contacts" – 3:59
 "Crack Mayor" – 4:56
 "Busboys, McDonald's and Minimum Wage" – 2:28
 "Taxes" – 2:21
 "Poor Whites" – 2:56
 "Rocky IV/Indians" – 1:50
 "Blacks Aren't Crazy" – 2:58
 "Uncle Bobby" – 1:28
 "Teenage Suicide" – 1:18
 "Prisons" – 2:49
 "Driving Too Slow" – 0:51
 "Women (Equal Rights, Honesty & Head)" – 6:32
 "My Father" – 1:25
 "Born Suspect" – 2:00
 "Your Mother's Got a Big Head" – 4:37
 "The Rib Man" (Mixell, Rock) – 3:12

Personnel 
 Prince Charles Alexander – Editing
 Diane Allford – Photography
 Kirth Atkins – Producer
 Angel  Colon – Producer
 Jimmy Douglas – Editing
 Dean Dydek – Editing Assistant
 Jam Master Jay – Producer
 Dennis King – Mastering
 Kooster McAllister – Engineer
 Frank Moscati – Photography
 Chris Rock – Producer
 Ted Sabety – Mixing
 Yano – Engineer

References 

Chris Rock albums
1991 live albums
Atlantic Records live albums